Elections to Liverpool Town Council were held on Monday 1 November 1858. One third of the council seats were up for election, the term of office of each councillor being three years.

Eleven of the sixteen wards were uncontested.

After the election, the composition of the council was:

Election result

Because of the large number of uncontested seats, these statistics should be taken in that context.

Ward results

* - Retiring Councillor seeking re-election

Abercromby

Polling Place : The Phoenix Inn, on the east side of Mount Pleasant, occupied by Edward Robinson.

Castle Street

Polling Place : The Commercial Hotel, Dale Street, occupied by Mr. Deakin

Everton

The polling place was Halliday's Coffee House, south west corner of Rupert Lane.

Exchange

Polling Place : The north end of the Sessions house in Chapel Street.

Great George

Polling Place : The Shop, No. 70, on the north side of Nelson Street, occupied by Edwin Thomas.

Lime Street

Polling Place : The House, No. 88, on the south side of London Road, occupied by Edward Ford.

North Toxteth

Polling Place : The house, No. 60, Saint Jame's Place, occupied by William Jones.

Pitt Street

Polling Place : The Committee room of the South Corporation School, in Park Lane.

Rodney Street

Polling Place : The Coffee House, No. 71, near the entrance to the new arcade, on the east side of Renshaw Street, occupied by Mr. Mitchells.

St. Anne Street

Polling Place : The House of Mrs. Hindle, No. 55 on the west side of Christian Street.

St. Paul's

Polling Place : The House of Mr. John Mather, at the north-west corner of St. Paul's Square.

St. Peter's

Polling Place : The Public House, sign of "The Ring of Bells" in School Lane, occupied by Mr. John Bennion.

Scotland

Polling place : The House, No. 237, on the north side of Burlington Street, occupied by Mr. Des?er.

Richard Sheil was the first Catholic elected to Liverpool Town Council.

South Toxteth

Polling Place : The shop on the west side of Park Road, occupied by Eliza Gould, near the church of St. John the Baptist.

Vauxhall

Polling Place : The House occupied by Mr. George Gurden, No. 167, on the west side of Vauxhall Road nearly opposite the end of Paul Street.

West Derby

Polling Place : The House on the south side of Edge Hill, in the occupation of John Jackson, and opposite St. Mary's Church.

By-elections

See also

Liverpool City Council

Liverpool Town Council elections 1835 - 1879

Liverpool City Council elections 1880–present

Mayors and Lord Mayors 
of Liverpool 1207 to present

History of local government in England

References

1858
1858 English local elections
November 1858 events
1850s in Liverpool